

Notes 

Motorcycles
Motorcycle museums in the United States
Lists of motorcycles
Technology collections